is a Japanese shōjo manga series written and illustrated by Akimi Yoshida. It was serialized by Shogakukan in Bessatsu Shōjo Comic between February 1983 and June 1984 and collected in four bound volumes. Kisshō Tennyo received the 1983 Shogakukan Manga Award for shōjo manga.

Characters
The main character, Sayoko Kanō, is implied to be a descendant (or possibly avatar) of the goddess Kisshō Tennyo.

Media

Manga
The individual chapters of the manga were collected in four tankōbon volumes released between September 1983 and September 1984. The series was re-released by Shogakukan in a two-volume bunkoban edition in February 1995.

List of volumes

Live-action
From April 15, 2006 to June 24, 2006, TV Asahi aired a live-action television adaptation of Kisshō Tennyo. There were 10 episodes in total. It was directed by Naomi Tamura and Toshiaki Kondō and starred Sayuri Iwata in the lead role of Sayoko Kanō.
 
On June 30, 2007, Blue Planet also released a live-action film adaptation of the series, directed by Ataru Oikawa and starring Anne Suzuki in the lead role. On December 21, 2007, Happinet Pictures released the film on DVD.

References

External links

 

1983 manga
2007 films
Akimi Yoshida
Live-action films based on manga
Films directed by Ataru Oikawa
2000s Japanese-language films
Manga adapted into films
Shogakukan manga
Shōjo manga
Winners of the Shogakukan Manga Award for shōjo manga
2000s Japanese films